Caombo or Cahombo is a town and municipality in Malanje Province in Angola. The municipality had a population of 21,511 in 2014.

References

Populated places in Malanje Province
Municipalities of Angola